Cosăuți is a commune in Soroca District, Moldova. It is composed of two villages, Cosăuți and Iorjnița. The commune is located on the Moldovan border with Ukraine, near the city of Yampil.

Notable people

References

Communes of Soroca District
Populated places on the Dniester